Hohenpeißenberg station is a railway station in the municipality of Hohenpeißenberg, in Bavaria, Germany. It is located on the Schongau–Peißenberg line of Deutsche Bahn.

Services
 the following services stop at Hohenpeißenberg:

References

External links
 
 Hohenpeißenberg layout 
 

Railway stations in Bavaria
Buildings and structures in Weilheim-Schongau